Nylander is a Scandinavian surname. It may refer to:

 Alexander Nylander (born 1998), Swedish ice hockey player
 Amanda Nylander (born 1990), Swedish figure skater
 Christer Nylander (born 1968), Swedish politician
 Erik Nylander (born 1981), Swedish jazz musician and composer
 Isabelle Nylander (born 1990), Swedish figure skater
 Justin A. Nylander (born ?), US-American author, musician and photographer
 Lennart Nylander (1901–1966), Swedish diplomat
 Michael Nylander (born 1972), Swedish ice hockey player
 Peter Nylander (born 1976), Swedish ice hockey player
 Sven Nylander (born 1962), Swedish Olympic hurdler
 Terry Nylander (born 1946), Canadian  politician
 William Nylander (botanist) (1822–1899), Finnish botanist and entomologist
 William Nylander (ice hockey) (born 1996), Swedish ice hockey player

See also
 Gustavus Reinhold Nyländer, (1776-1825) missionary
 Nylander's test, a chemical test